In immunology, immunocompetence is the ability of the body to produce a normal immune response following exposure to an antigen. Immunocompetence is the opposite of immunodeficiency (also known as immuno-incompetence or being immuno-compromised). Examples include:
 a newborn who does not yet have a fully functioning immune system but may have maternally transmitted antibodies – immunodeficient;
 a late stage AIDS patient with a failed or failing immune system – immuno-incompetent; or
 a transplant recipient taking medication so their body will not reject the donated organ – immunocompromised.
There may be cases of overlap but these terms all describe immune system not fully functioning.

The US Centers for Disease Control and Prevention (CDC) recommends that household and other close contacts of persons with altered immunocompetence receive the MMR, varicella, and rotavirus vaccines according to the standard schedule of vaccines, as well as receiving an annual flu shot. All other vaccines may be administered to contacts without alteration to the vaccine schedule, with the exception of the smallpox vaccine. Persons with altered immunocompetence should not receive live, attenuated vaccines (viral or bacterial), and may not receive the full benefit of inactivated vaccines.

In reference to lymphocytes, immunocompetence means that a B cell or T cell is mature and can recognize antigens and allow a person to mount an immune response. In order for lymphocytes such as T cells to become immunocompetent, which refers to the ability of lymphocyte cell receptors to recognize MHC molecules, they must undergo positive selection.  Adaptive immunocompetence is regulated by growth hormone (GH), prolactin (PRL), and vasopressin (VP) – hormones secreted by the pituitary gland.

See also 
 Immunopharmacology and Immunotoxicology (medical journal)
 Parasite-stress theory

References 

Immunology

de:Immunkompetenz